Hickman Elementary School may refer to:
Hickman Elementary School - San Diego Unified School District - San Diego, California
Hickman Elementary School - Metro Nashville Public Schools - Nashville, Tennessee
Hickman Elementary School - Garland Independent School District - Garland, Texas